Lectionary 200, designated by siglum ℓ 200 (in the Gregory-Aland numbering), is a Greek parchment manuscript of the New Testament. Palaeographically it has been assigned to the 12th century. 
Scrivener labelled it by 208evl.

Description 

The codex contains lessons from the Gospels of John, Matthew, Luke lectionary (Evangelistarium), on 292 parchment leaves.
The text is written in Greek minuscule letters, two columns per page, 23 lines per page. It contains musical notes.

There are weekday Gospel lessons.

History 

Scrivener and Gregory dated the manuscript to the 12th century. It has been assigned by the Institute for New Testament Textual Research to the 12th century.

The manuscript was added to the list of New Testament manuscripts by Scrivener (number 208) and Gregory (number 200). Gregory saw it in 1883.

The manuscript is not cited in the critical editions of the Greek New Testament (UBS3).

The codex is located in the Bodleian Library (E. D. Clarke 47) at Oxford.

See also 

 List of New Testament lectionaries
 Biblical manuscript
 Textual criticism

Notes and references

Bibliography 

 

Greek New Testament lectionaries
12th-century biblical manuscripts
Bodleian Library collection